Hitch is the third studio album by the Welsh alternative rock band the Joy Formidable. The album was released on 25 March 2016 by the C'mon Let's Drift label in the UK, and Caroline Records in the US.

Background and recording
In comparison to the band's prior album, Wolf's Law, which was mainly written on the road while touring, Hitch was recorded in lead singer Ritzy Bryan's old family home, outside Mold in Wales.

Release and promotion
A music video for the single "The Last Thing on My Mind" was released on 26 January 2016.

On 22 March 2016, the band previewed a stream of the entire album on their SoundCloud page.

Track listing

Charts

References

External links
 Official website

2016 albums
Atlantic Records albums
The Joy Formidable albums